Ivan Todosijević (born 16 July 1973) is a Kosovo Serb politician. He was a minister in the Government of Kosovo from 2017 to 2019 and a member of the Assembly of Kosovo from 2019 to 2021. He has also been designated by the Serbian government as the leader of Zvečan's provisional authority since 2015, although this role is not recognized by the authorities in Priština.

In 2019, Todosijević was convicted by a court in Priština of incitement to national, racial, ethnic, or religious intolerance for saying that the characterization of Yugoslavia's January 1999 Račak operation as a massacre was a fabrication by "Albanian terrorists" used to justify the NATO bombing of Yugoslavia. A 2021 Court of Appeals decision upheld the verdict against him, but the Supreme Court of Kosovo quashed it later in the year and ordered a new trial. Serbian president Aleksandar Vučić has supported Todosijević and has described his conviction as a violation of the 2013 Brussels Agreement, which normalized some aspects of the relationship between Belgrade and Priština.

Early life and career
Todosijević was born in Kosovska Mitrovica, in what was then the Socialist Autonomous Province of Kosovo in the Socialist Republic of Serbia, Socialist Federal Republic of Yugoslavia. He received his early education there and in Zvečan, and later graduated from the University of Priština Faculty of Agriculture with a focus on fruit growing and viticulture. He was awarded a master's degree in 2010 for a thesis on the production of Cabernet Sauvignon grapes in North Mitrovica. Since 2002, he has been manager of horticulture at the JKP Standard in North Mitrovica.

Politician
Todosijević is a member of the Serbian Progressive Party (Srpska napredna stranka, SNS) and the Serb List (Srpska lista). 

Following the signing of the Brussels Agreement in 2013, the Serbian government dissolved the municipal assemblies in four northern Kosovo municipalities, including Zvečan, and appointed provisional councils in their place. Todosijević was appointed to the council in Zvečan. He stood down from this role in January 2014; in the same year, he was appointed as director of JKSP Zvečan. On 30 September 2015, he was promoted by the Serbian government to president of the provisional authority in the municipality. By virtue of holding this role, he is the leader of a parallel (or, more precisely, overlapping) authority in relation to that of Dragiša Milović, the Serb List mayor of Zvečan under local elections sponsored by Priština.

Todosijević was himself a candidate for the Zvečan municipal assembly in the 2017 local elections sponsored by Priština, appearing in the lead position on the Serb List's electoral list. He was elected when the List won a majority victory with thirteen out of nineteen seats.

Government Minister in Kosovo
Ramush Haradinaj of the Alliance for the Future of Kosovo (Aleanca për Ardhmërinë e Kosovës, AAK) became prime minister of Kosovo for the second time in September 2017. The Serb List supported Haradinaj's government and received three ministerial positions; Todosijević was appointed as minister of administration and local government. His appointment was somewhat controversial, due to his holding of a Serbian government position in Zvečan that the Priština government considers as illegal. As a minister, Todosijević was a prominent advocate for the establishment of the Community of Serb Municipalities in Kosovo, as envisioned by the 2013 Brussels Agreement.

In March 2019, Todosijević spoke at an event commemorating the twentieth anniversary of the NATO bombing of Yugoslavia. Among other things, he said, "the reason for the aggression against our country was the so-called humanitarian catastrophe in Kosovo and Metohija, the fictional Račak." He also referred to "Albanian terrorists" as having committed the greatest crimes in Kosovo, using the word "Šiptar" (often considered as offensive) for Albanians. On 8 April 2019, Haradinaj removed Todosijević from office because of these statements. Legal proceedings were also launched against him.

Assembly of Kosovo
Following his removal from cabinet, Todosijević appeared as a candidate of the Serb List in the 2019 Kosovan parliamentary election. The election was held under open list proportional representation; Todosijević finished sixth among his party's candidates and was elected when the list won ten mandates. The Serb List participated in Kosovo's coalition governments after the election, and Todosijević served as a government supporter. He was a member of the committee on the rights and interests of communities and returns.

On 5 December 2019, a basic court in Priština convicted Todosijević of incitement to intolerance for his statements about Račak and imposed a two-year prison sentence. He appealed the decision; as the verdict was not final, he did not lose his seat in parliament.

He again appeared as a candidate of the Serb List in the 2021 Kosovan parliamentary election, finished fifth among the party's candidates, and was re-elected when the List again won ten mandates. After the election, he served with the rest of Serb List in opposition to Albin Kurti's administration. He later led the Serb List's electoral list for the Zvečan municipal assembly in the 2021 Kosovan local elections and was re-elected when the List won eighteen of nineteen seats.

2021: Verdict Confirmation and Annulment
Kosovo's Court of Appeals confirmed the original verdict and sentence against Todosijević on 24 August 2021.

Todosijević did not show up to begin his sentence in October 2021; his lawyer said that he did not receive a summons as required by law. He lost his mandate in the local assembly on 23 November 2019 by a decision of Kosovo's electoral commission and was deprived of his seat in the Assembly of Kosovo shortly thereafter.

Serbian president Aleksandar Vučić has supported Todosijević throughout his trials, endorsing his depiction of Račak as a fabrication. Todosijević's supporters, including Vučić, have also argued that the composition of the judicial panel (which had three Albanian justices and no Serbs) was a violation of the terms of the Brussels Agreement. The European Commission endorsed the latter position in an October 2021 report on Kosovo, reprimanding the Kosovo authorities for violating the judicial agreement in the matter of Todosijević's trial.

On 28 December 2021, the Supreme Court of Kosovo quashed Todosijević's conviction and ordered a new trial.

Notes

References

1973 births
Living people
People from Mitrovica, Kosovo
People from Zvečan
Kosovo Serbs
Government ministers of Kosovo
Members of the Assembly of the Republic of Kosovo
Serbian Progressive Party politicians
Serb List (Kosovo) politicians